Gentianella concinna is a flowering plant species, endemic to the Auckland Islands of New Zealand.

Description
The leaves are fleshy and leathery, oblong-spatheolate to linear-oblong in shape, gradually narrowing into broad, flat petioles. The flowers are borne singly in the axils of the upper leaves. The calyces are about one third the length of the corollas.

Taxonomy
It was first described in 1844 by Joseph Dalton Hooker as Gentiana concinna. Its currently accepted name is Gentianella concinna, having been assigned to the genus Gentianella by the authors, Ho and Liu in 1993.

Conservation status
In both 2009 and 2012 it was deemed to be "At Risk - Naturally Uncommon" under the New Zealand Threat Classification System, and this classification was reaffirmed in 2018, due to the species being an island endemic and having a restricted range.

References

Endemic flora of New Zealand
Flora of the Auckland Islands
concinna
Plants described in 1844